Patrick Jules Maria Vankrunkelsven (born 2 May 1957), is a Belgian physician, professor of medicine and politician. He obtained an MD and PhD from the Katholieke Universiteit Leuven (Leuven, Belgium).

Political career
He was president of the Volksunie from 1998 until 2000, succeeding Bert Anciaux. When that party was dissolved in 2001, he initially chose the left-liberal SPIRIT, but eventually went to the VLD where he was senator from 2007 until 2011. He was part of the party's left wing. Patrik Vankrunkelsven has been mayor of Laakdal from 1994 to 2006.

At the end of 2009, he announced that he would leave politics to refocus on his medical practice and his professional status at the university.

Notes

Flemish activists
Open Vlaamse Liberalen en Democraten politicians
Members of the Belgian Federal Parliament
KU Leuven alumni
Living people
1957 births
People's Union (Belgium) politicians
People from Geel